Volere volare (To Want to Fly) is a 1991 Italian comedy film co-written, co-directed by and starring Maurizio Nichetti. It is a live-action animated film. The male lead is a man who dubs sound effects for cartoons and who is slowly turning into a cartoon. Right before becoming a cartoon, he meets a woman with a very unusual job with whom he falls in love. His transformation complicates both his private and professional life.

Plot summary
Maurizio is a funny and clumsy Italian voice actor and sound effects artist for old American cartoons, while his brother and business partner does the same for pornographic films. Martina is a self-styled "social worker" who charges harmless men with unusual desires a fee to act out their fantasies, such as a taxi driver who enjoys terrifying passengers with stunt driving. The two meet, and fall in love. One day, however, Maurizio suffers an accident that slowly starts to turn him into a cartoon.

Cast
Maurizio Nichetti ...  Maurizio 'Sbaffino'
Angela Finocchiaro ...  Martina
Mariella Valentini ...  Loredana
Patrizio Roversi ...  Patrizio
Remo Remotti ...  The 'Child'
Mario Gravier ...  Architect at Home #1
Luigi Gravier ...  Architect at Home #2
Renato Scarpa ...  Clerk
Massimo Sarchielli ...  Chef
Osvaldo Salvi ...  Necrophyle man
Lisa Biondi ...  Necrophyle woman
Enrico Grazioli ...  Taxi driver
Mario Pardi ...  Thief 
Valeria Cavalli ...  Woman on the street
Rocco Cosentino ...  Shop assistant
Sergio Cosentino ...  Shop assistant
Aldo Izzo ...  Client
Riccardo Magherini ...  Client in store of Loredana
Rosanna Olmo ...  Dubber
Regina Stagnitti ...  Actress in movie
Lidia Biondi

External links
 
 
 Volere volare at Variety Distribution

1991 films
Commedia all'italiana
1990s fantasy comedy films
Italian animated films
1990s Italian-language films
Films with live action and animation
Films set in Milan
Films directed by Maurizio Nichetti
Films scored by Manuel De Sica
Films about animation
1991 comedy films
1990s Italian films